The Churchill Hotel Near Embassy Row is a hotel located at 1914 Connecticut Avenue NW in Washington, D.C., United States.  The Beaux-Arts style building was erected in 1902 as The Highlands apartment house, designed by local architect Arthur B. Heaton.  It was later renovated into a hotel, but still kept some of its historic features. According to the Churchill Hotel, its rooms contain elements of the original building.  The Churchill is a member of Historic Hotels of America, the official program of the National Trust for Historic Preservation.

References

External links

 

Hotels in Washington, D.C.
Residential buildings completed in 1902
Historic Hotels of America